The Kerry-Tyrone rivalry is a Gaelic football rivalry between Irish county teams Kerry and Tyrone, who first played each other in 1986. It is considered to be one of the biggest rivalries in modern Gaelic games. Kerry's home ground is Fitzgerald Stadium and Tyrone's home ground is Healy Park, however, all but one of their championship meetings have been held at neutral venues, usually Croke Park.

While Kerry have the highest number of Munster titles and Tyrone are third on the roll of honour in Ulster, they have also enjoyed success in the All-Ireland Senior Football Championship, having won 40 championship titles between them to date.

All-time results

Legend

Senior

References

Tyrone
Tyrone county football team rivalries